The 2018 PPG 400 was the 8th stock car race of the 2018 NASCAR Camping World Truck Series season and the 22nd iteration of the event. The race was held on Friday, June 8, 2018 in Fort Worth, Texas at Texas Motor Speedway, a  permanent quad-oval racetrack. The race took the scheduled 167 laps to complete. At race's end, Johnny Sauter of GMS Racing would hold off Stewart Friesen to win the race, the 21st NASCAR Camping World Truck Series win of his career and the 4th of the season. To fill out the podium, Stewart Friesen of Halmar Friesen Racing and Justin Haley of GMS Racing finished 2nd and 3rd, respectively.

Background 
Texas Motor Speedway is a speedway located in the northernmost portion of the U.S. city of Fort Worth, Texas – the portion located in Denton County, Texas. The track measures 1.5 miles (2.4 km) around and is banked 24 degrees in the turns, and is of the oval design, where the front straightaway juts outward slightly. The track layout is similar to Atlanta Motor Speedway and Charlotte Motor Speedway (formerly Lowe's Motor Speedway). The track is owned by Speedway Motorsports, Inc., the same company that owns Atlanta and Charlotte Motor Speedway, as well as the short-track Bristol Motor Speedway.

Entry list

Practice 
Initially, two practice sessions were scheduled for the event- however, second practice would be rained out, meaning that second practice was canceled.

First and final practice 
The first and final practice took place on 3:05 PM CST.

Qualifying 
Qualifying would take place on Friday, June 8 on 4:45 CST. Since Texas Motor Speedway is at least a  racetrack, the qualifying system was a single car, single lap, two round system where in the first round, everyone would set a time to determine positions 13-32. Then, the fastest 12 qualifiers would move on to the second round to determine positions 1-12.

Mike Harmon of Mike Harmon Racing would be the only driver not to qualify.

Race results 
Stage 1 Laps: 40

Stage 2 Laps: 40

Stage 3 Laps: 87

References 

2018 NASCAR Camping World Truck Series
NASCAR races at Texas Motor Speedway
June 2018 sports events in the United States
2018 in sports in Texas